Alan Price (born 19 April 1942) is an English musician. He was the original keyboardist for the British band the Animals before he left to form his own band the Alan Price Set. He was inducted into the Rock and Roll Hall of Fame in 1994 as a member of the Animals. He is also known for his solo work and his occasional acting roles. His best known songs include "Jarrow Song" and "The House That Jack Built".

Early life and career 
Price was born in Fatfield, Washington, County Durham. He was educated at Jarrow Grammar School, County Durham. He is a self-taught musician and was a founding member of the Tyneside group the Alan Price Rhythm and Blues Combo, which was later renamed the Animals. His organ-playing on songs by The Animals, such as "The House of the Rising Sun", "Don't Let Me Be Misunderstood", and "Bring It On Home to Me" was a key element in the group's success.

After leaving the Animals, Price went on to have success with his own band the Alan Price Set and later with Georgie Fame. He introduced the songs of Randy Newman to a wider audience. Later, he appeared on his own television show and achieved success with film scores, including winning critical acclaim for his musical contribution to the film O Lucky Man! (1973), as well as writing the score to the stage musical Andy Capp. Price has also acted in films and television productions.

Music
Price formed the Animals in 1962 and left the band in 1965 to form the Alan Price Set, with the line-up of Price, Clive Burrows (baritone saxophone), Steve Gregory (tenor saxophone), John Walters (trumpet), Peter Kirtley (guitar), Rod "Boots" Slade (bass) and "Little" Roy Mills (drums). In the same year, he appeared in the film Don't Look Back which featured Bob Dylan on tour in the UK.

During 1966, he enjoyed singles success with "I Put a Spell on You", which reached number 9 in the UK singles chart, and "Hi-Lili, Hi-Lo" which reached number 11 in the same chart. In 1967, the Randy Newman song "Simon Smith and His Amazing Dancing Bear" reached number four in the chart, as did his self-penned song, "The House That Jack Built". "Don't Stop the Carnival" followed in 1968, and rose to number 13 in the UK singles charts.

Price went on to host shows such as the musical Price To Play in the late 1960s, which featured him performing and introducing the music of guests such as Fleetwood Mac and Jimi Hendrix. His second album, A Price on His Head (1967), featured seven songs by Randy Newman, who was virtually unknown at that time. In August 1967, he appeared with The Animals at the hippie love-in that was held in the grounds of Woburn Abbey.

A later association with Georgie Fame resulted in "Rosetta", which became a top-20 hit (1971), reaching number 11 in the UK Singles Chart. An album followed, Fame and Price, Price and Fame Together. During this period, Price and Fame secured a regular slot on The Two Ronnies show produced by BBC Television, and also appeared on the Morecambe and Wise Show. He recorded the autobiographical album Between Today and Yesterday (1974) from which the single "Jarrow Song" was taken, returning Price to the UK singles chart at number six. The minor single hits by Price "Just For You" and "Baby of Mine" from 1978 and 1979, respectively, as well as being issued on the usual black vinyl, were also released as red, heart-shaped vinyl discs, which reflected the craze for coloured and oddly shaped vinyl records at the time.

Price participated in three reunions of The Animals between 1968 and 1984. In July 1983, they started their last world tour. Price's solo performance of "Oh Lucky Man" was included in their set. In 1984, they broke up for the final time, and the album Greatest Hits Live (Rip It to Shreds) was released, comprising recordings from their concert at Wembley Arena in London supporting The Police.

Price recorded two albums with the Electric Blues Company featuring guitarist and vocalist Bobby Tench and keyboardist Zoot Money, the first, Covers, was recorded in 1994. A Gigster's Life for Me followed in 1996 and was recorded as part of Sanctuary's Blues Masters Series, at Olympic Studios in south-west London.

Since 1996, Price has continued to perform regularly, arrange, write songs, and create other works. During the 2000s, he has continued to tour the UK with his own band and others, including the Manfreds, Maggie Bell and Bobby Tench.

Savaloy Dip was officially released in 2016. Due to an issuing error after the recording of this album in 1974 the album was re-called by the record company and not re-released at that time. The title track for his album Between Today and Yesterday was taken from the original Savaloy Dip recording.

Film, stage and TV
Price appears in the D. A. Pennebaker documentary Don't Look Back (1965) and is in several scenes with Bob Dylan and his entourage, including one where his departure from the Animals is mentioned.

Price has been closely involved with the work of film director Lindsay Anderson. He wrote the music for Anderson's film O Lucky Man! (1973), which he performs on screen in the film and appears as himself in one part of the storyline. The score won the 1974 BAFTA Award for Best Film Music.

Later, he wrote the score to Anderson's final film, The Whales of August (1987).

He acted as the lead in Alfie Darling (1975), a sequel to the film Alfie (1966), during the course of which he became romantically involved with his co-star, Jill Townsend. He also composed and sang the theme tune to the film adaptation of The Plague Dogs (1982), "Time and Tide".

In 1979, Price composed and sang the theme song to the ATV series Turtle's Progress. In 1981 he composed the score for the musical Andy Capp based on the eponymous comic strip. He also wrote the lyrics, together with the actor Trevor Peacock. The play transferred from the Royal Exchange Theatre, Manchester, to London's Aldwych Theatre in September 1982. Price later provided the theme to Thames Television's 1988 sitcom adaptation of Andy Capp in the form of a rewritten "Jarrow Song". Other TV theme work includes a re-recorded version of his 1974 single "Papers", which was used as the theme tune to the London Weekend Television situation comedy Hot Metal and the song "Changes", soundtrack to a popular TV commercial for the VW Golf.

In 1992, Anderson included an episode in his autobiographical BBC film Is That All There Is?, with a boat trip down the River Thames to scatter Rachel Roberts and Jill Bennett's ashes on the waters, while Price accompanied himself and sang the song "Is That All There Is?".

In 2004, Price appeared in the Christmas edition of Heartbeat as Frankie Rio, the leader of a dubious band of musicians, the Franke Rio Trio, who are booked to appear in the Aidensfield Village Concert. The episode was entitled "In the Bleak Midwinter".

Film appearances
"Get Yourself A College Girl" (1964). Himself
 Dont Look Back (1967), Himself
 O Lucky Man! (1973), Alan, soundtrack
 Alfie Darling (1975), Alfie Elkins, soundtrack
 Britannia Hospital (1982), soundtrack
 The Plague Dogs (1982), soundtrack
  Is That All There Is?  (1993), Himself

TV appearances
 Ready, Steady, Go! – as the Alan Price Set (9 December 1966)
 Beat-Club – 1967–68
 Top of the Pops – 7 April 1966, performing "I Put a Spell on You" with the Alan Price Set
 Top of the Pops – 14 July 1966, performing "Hi Lili, Hi Lo" with the Alan Price Set
 Top of the Pops – 15 February 1968, performing "Don't Stop The Carnival" with the Alan Price Set
 Disco – Episode No. 1.5 as Price and Fame (1971)
 The Two Ronnies – as himself (1972) eight episodes
 Saturday Night Live – as himself (April 1977)
 Pop Quiz – as himself (25 September 1984)
 Heartbeat – Frankie Rio (a "shifty" musician) "In the Bleak Midwinter" (2004)

Personal life
Price is believed to have two children and has been married twice. He married Maureen Elizabeth Donneky at Fulham towards the end of 1971. The couple divorced. Price and Donneky had one daughter, Elizabeth.

In 1992, he was living in London with his second wife Alison and two daughters.

Price is a Sunderland A.F.C. supporter although, ironically, Sunderland's local rivals Newcastle United often used his version of "Blaydon Races" at matches. In 2011, he took part in the Sunderland A.F.C. charity Foundation of Light event.

Discography

Awards
1974 Golden Globe nomination for O Lucky Man!
1973 BAFTA (Anthony Asquith Memorial Award) for O Lucky Man

Notes

References 
 Burdon, Eric. I Used to Be an Animal, but I'm All Right Now. Faber and Faber, 1986. 
 Burdon, Eric (with J. Marshall Craig). Don't Let Me Be Misunderstood: A Memoir. Thunder's Mouth Press, 2001.

External links

 
 

Living people
English male singer-songwriters
English keyboardists
English rock keyboardists
English rock pianists
English organists
British male organists
The Animals members
Parrot Records artists
Deram Records artists
Decca Records artists
Polydor Records artists
Warner Records artists
People from Fatfield
Musicians from Tyne and Wear
British rhythm and blues boom musicians
English male television actors
English male film actors
English blues singers
21st-century organists
Best Original Music BAFTA Award winners
1942 births